Linda Gordon is an American feminist and historian.  She lives in New York City and in Madison, Wisconsin. She won the Marfield Prize for Dorothea Lange: A Life Beyond Limits, and the Antonovych Prize for Cossack Rebellions: Social Turmoil in the Sixteenth-Century Ukraine (SUNY Press, 1983).

Career
Linda Gordon was born in Chicago but considers Portland, Oregon, her home town. Gordon is the daughter of William and Helen Appelman Gordon and the sister of Laurence Edward Gordon and Lee David Gordon. She is the wife of Allen Hunter and they have one daughter, Rosa Gordon Hunter, of Cambridge, MA. She graduated from Swarthmore College, and from Yale University with an MA and PhD in Russian History. Her dissertation was later published as Cossack Rebellions.

She taught at the University of Massachusetts-Boston from 1968 to 1984, and at the University of Wisconsin–Madison from 1984 to 1999. The University of Wisconsin awarded her the university's most prestigious chair professorship, the Vilas Research Chair. Today, she is University Professor of the Humanities and Professor of History at New York University. Gordon was a founding associate editor of the Journal of Women's History and serves on the advisory board of Signs: Journal of Women in Culture and Society.

Starting in the 1970s, Gordon's research and writing examined the historical roots of contemporary social policy debates in the US, particularly as they concern gender and family issues. Her book on these topics, Woman's Body, Woman's Right (published in 1976 and reissued in 1990), remains the definitive history of birth control politics in the US. It was completely revised and re-published in 2002 as The Moral Property of Women.

In 1988 she published a historical study of how the U.S. has dealt with family violence, including child abuse, spousal violence and sexual abuse, Heroes of Their Own Lives, which won the Joan Kelly prize of the American Historical Association. The study was funded in part by a 1979 grant from the National Endowment for the Humanities.

Pitied But Not Entitled, her history of welfare, won the Berkshire Prize for best book in women's history and the Gustavus Myers Human Rights Award. Gordon was active with the failed campaign of a group of scholars of welfare protesting the repeal of Aid to Families with Dependent Children in 1996.

She served on the National Advisory Council on Violence Against Women during the Clinton administration.

Changing direction in the 1990s, Gordon began to explore narrative, story-telling history, as a way of bringing large-scale historical developments to life. A westerner herself, she wanted to write stories that would help to counteract the East Coast bias in the way American history has been told. Her book The Great Arizona Orphan Abduction, the story of a vigilante action against Mexican-Americans, won the Bancroft Prize for best book in American history and the Beveridge Award for best book on the history of the Western Hemisphere.

Her biography of photographer Dorothea Lange won many prizes, including: the Bancroft prize for best book about US history (making Gordon one of the very few ever to win this award twice); the Los Angeles Times Book Prize for Biography; and the National Arts Club prize for best arts writing, to name a few. In the process of researching that book, she discovered an important group of Lange photographs long unnoticed and never published: photographs of the internment of Japanese Americans during World War II, commissioned by the US Army but then impounded because they were too critical of the internment policy. Gordon selected 119 of these images and published them, with introductory essays by herself and by historian Gary Okihiro.

Gordon was elected to the American Philosophical Society in 2015.

In 2017, Gordon published The Second Coming of the KKK: The Ku Klux Klan of the 1920s and the American Political Tradition.

References

Writings
  Details.
  Details.
  Reissued by the University of Illinois Press 2002. Details.
  Harvard University Press 1995. Details.
 
  Details.
  Details.
  Details.
  Details.
  Details.

Books edited
  Details. Revised ed. 1995.
  Details.

Selected articles
 Why policies that seem to put children first have so often disadvantaged children. (in Journal of the History of Childhood and Youth 1 #3, Fall 2008.)

 (Journal of the Gilded Age and Progressive Era, April 2002)

, with Nancy Fraser, in Signs 19 #2, winter 1994.
, in Journal of American History 78 #2, 1991.
, (The Nation, May 29, 2008)
, in On Violence: a Reader, ed. Bruce B. Lawrence and Aisha Karim, 2007.

External links
"Author's website"

"Linda Gordon", History News Network, November 12, 2006 
Student papers, 1976. Schlesinger Library, Radcliffe Institute, Harvard University.

Living people
21st-century American historians
Jewish American historians
Swarthmore College alumni
Yale University alumni
New York University faculty
Radcliffe fellows
American women historians
Historians of Ukraine
Feminist historians
Members of the American Philosophical Society
Writers from Chicago
Writers from Portland, Oregon
Year of birth missing (living people)
Bancroft Prize winners
21st-century American women
Historians from Illinois
21st-century American Jews